The Type 66 is a 152 mm towed howitzer used by the People's Liberation Army of China.  The gun system is developed from the Soviet D-20 towed artillery. In addition to conventional shells the gun is capable of firing Type MP-152 rocket-assisted projectiles.  In some cases a gun-shield is fitted but this is not universal.

Versions 
Type 66-1: Improved version.
6x6 mobile gun: Self-propelled version.
Type 83 SPH: Improved towed and self-propelled versions.

Operators
 
 90 in service in 2002
 
 4 received in 1999

 46 in service 

 People's Liberation Army Ground Force - 500

Former operators
 Liberation Tigers of Tamil Eelam: 9

Gallery

References

External links
 Type 66 122MM TOWED GUN-HOWITZER
 http://fas.org/man/dod-101/sys/land/row/d-20.htm

152 mm artillery
Field artillery of the Cold War
Artillery of the People's Republic of China
China–Soviet Union relations